Wanquan is a district of the city of Zhangjiakou, in the northwest of Hebei province, China, located just to the southwest of Zhangjiakou's urban core. It was the site of the Battle of the Badger's Mouth Pass, one of the major campaigns in the Mongol–Jin War

Administrative divisions
The district administers 4 towns and 7 townships:

Towns:
Kongjiazhuang, Wanquan, Ximalin, Guoleizhuang

Townships:
Shanfangbu Township, Beixintun Township, Xuanpingbu Township, Gaomiaobu Township, Jiubu Township, Anjiabu Township, Beishacheng Township

Geography and Climate
Wanquan is located in the northwest of Hebei province. Its western and northern borders are defined by the Great Wall, across which it borders Shangyi and Zhangbei counties. The southern border is defined by the Yang River, across which it borders Huai'an County.

Transport
China National Highway 110
China National Highway 207
G6 Beijing–Lhasa Expressway

References

County-level divisions of Hebei
Zhangjiakou